The 1996 Australian GT Production Car Championship was a CAMS sanctioned motor racing title for drivers of Group 3E Series Production Cars. The championship, which was organised and promoted by Procar Australia, was contested over an eight-round series with two races per round.
 Round 1, Amaroo Park, New South Wales, 18 May
 Round 2, Lakeside, Queensland, 23 June
 Round 3, Amaroo Park, New South Wales, 14 July
 Round 4, Mallala, South Australia, 11 August
 Round 5, Winton, Victoria, 25 August
 Round 6, Phillip Island, Victoria, 22 September
 Round 7, Lakeside, Queensland, 27 October
 Round 8, Oran Park, New South Wales, 8 November

Outright championship points were awarded on a 15–12–10–8–6–5–4–3–2–1 basis to the top ten finishers in each race with a bonus point awarded to the driver setting pole position for each round. Class points were awarded on the same basis to the top ten class finishers in each race but with no bonus point for pole position.

Results

Class placings

References

Further reading

 CAMS Report, issue No 115, Autumn 1996, page 1
 Motor Racing Australia, January / February 1997, page 87
 Official Program, Mallala, 11 August 1996
 Procar results sheets for the 1996 Australian GT Production Car Championship 
 Australian Auto Action, 17–23 May 1996
 Australian Auto Action, 21–27 June 1996
 Australian Auto Action, 18–24 July 1996, page 43
 Australian Auto Action, 15–21 August 1996, page 43
 Australian Auto Action, 23–29 August 1996, 
 Australian Auto Action, 23–29 September 1996
 Australian Auto Action, 31 October – 6 November 1996, pages 42–43
 Australian Auto Action, 5–11 November 1996

External links
Images from the 1996 Australian GT Production Car Championship (not all thumbnails will open) Retrieved from web.archive.org on 20 January 2009

Australian GT Production Car Championship
GT Production Car Championship
Procar Australia